Several Canadian naval units have been named HMCS Anticosti.

  (I) was an  trawler that served in the Royal Canadian Navy during the Second World War.
  (II) was an  that served in the Canadian Forces during the 1990s.

Royal Canadian Navy ship names